Bernice Gottlieb (née Friedman, born January 8, 1931, in Bronx, New York) was an early leader in the trans-racial adoption (also known as interracial adoption) movement in the United States.  In later years, she led a residential real estate firm and authored several books, including one on adoption.

Early Years
Raised in Brooklyn, New York, Gottlieb graduated from New Utrecht High School, in Brooklyn, in 1949.  She married New York architect Ferdinand Gottlieb in 1953.

Pioneer in Transracial Adoption
In 1968, before adoption agencies in the northeast existed for the purpose, Gottlieb flew to South Korea in search of an orphaned child to adopt.  In 1969, Gottlieb and her husband become one of the early American families of non-Asian heritage to adopt a Korean child, and the first from one of Korea's major orphanages. After an extended immigration process, Bernice Gottlieb and her husband formally adopted a 2-year-old Korean orphan in 1969.

Gottlieb's adoption of a Korean child brought publicity to the cause of transracial adoptions, and to her family.  Over the next decade, Gottlieb would rise to national and global prominence as one of the leading international adoption advocates.

Efforts in Korea
In 1972, Gottlieb was approached by a Korean Roman Catholic priest, Rev. Alexander Lee (Korean name Lee Kyong‐Jai), the administrator (from 1970 until his death in 1998) of a leprosy resettlement community, St. Lazarus Village, near Suwon, South Korea.  Father Lee told Gottlieb of the significant stigma and isolation for those living in Korea with leprosy, also known as Hansen’s disease. Although treatable, many patients are disfigured by leprosy if untreated, and "widespread misinformation about transmission" resulted in discrimination.

From 1974 to 1976, while serving as director of an adoption program, Operation Outreach, as well as the New York State representative to the Committee of One Thousand, a 30,000‐member group concerned with children in need, she succeeded in arranging for the unusual adoption of eight children born to patients in a so-called "leper colony" of South Korea by a number of American families. One of the parents of the original adoptive children faced the reality with great sadness but hope that his children would not suffer the same fate.  "If the girls stayed, and they grew up and had boyfriends and they found that the girls’ parents were lepers, then our daughters would forever have hearts stamped with pain. The future for them here is bleak. They must go. Me and my wife would like our misery to end with this generation."  In order to arrange these adoptions, Gottlieb lobbied Congress in 1976 to pass, for each child, a private bill to allow the unorphaned foreign-born children to emigrate to the United States for adoption by United States citizens.

The program was believed to be unprecedented in that the birth parents would retain a connection with their biological children, and the children, who showed no signs of leprosy, would be relinquished "so they may lead healthy, happy lives here, free of the 'untouchable' [leprosy] brand."  Over time, the program resulted in numerous additional adoptions. Her 2010 book, Take My Children, tells this story.

Outreach to India and United Nations
In late 1974, the Indian leprosy association, Hind Kusht Nivaran Sangh, contacted Gottlieb in an effort to extend the Outreach adoption program to children living in  leprosy colonies in India.  Ultimately, after Gottlieb visited the country on a lengthy tour of leprosy villages, the government of India agreed to allow the foreign adoption of up to 25 children born to Leprosy patients to American parents.  Gottlieb's fact finding trip found that the children in India often lived in difficult situations, but faced somewhat different obstacles from the Korean children in that could attend local schools if adequately supported from abroad.  She instead started a fund to provide the children with uniforms and books.

In 1979, the International Year of the Child, Gottlieb authored and presented to the United Nations a research paper on "The Fact of Stigma," and a copy of the research is maintained in the archives of the Jimmy Carter Presidential Library.

Later Efforts
Gottlieb retired from the adoption movement in the early 1980's, and was the principal for over twenty years of a residential real estate firm in Irvington, New York, Hudson Shores Realtors, before merging it into another firm. In 1998, she was the recipient of an Ellis Island Medal of Honor.

In 2000, writing to the New York Times, Gottlieb asserted that "[t]he most successful adoptions, in my opinion, are those that gave the children pride in their heritage, but only as a footnote to their new life and identity. The children may look different on the outside, as one Korean adoptee is quoted as saying, but what you see is not what you get! Despite the challenges, it's amazing what love can do."

In a second letter to the editor to the New York Times, in 2013, Gottlieb described a significant and longstanding barrier to  foreign adoptions: "One of the major obstacles in foreign adoptions, and one that is rarely considered, is that countries that participate in exporting children for adoption face the wrath of their citizenry, because they do not take care of their most vulnerable population. It is really a matter of pride, and this, unfortunately, is the basis for all the other bureaucratic obstacles that go along with it."

References 

1931 births
Living people
People from New York City
Adoption in the United States
Multiracial affairs in the United States
Adoption workers